The Elkridge Site, or Elkridge Prehistoric Village Archeological Site, is an archaeological site near Elkridge in Anne Arundel County, Maryland. It is located on a  terrace above the Patapsco River and extends  along the river and inland from 20 to 400 feet.  It is the only known Woodland period riverine-oriented village site in the tidewater Patapsco River valley which has at least partially escaped the totally destructive forces of gravel quarrying. The site appears to have been abandoned as a permanent village in the early 16th century.

It was listed on the National Register of Historic Places in 1978.

In 2022, the Maryland Department of Transportation and Department of Natural Resources funded $50,000 for archaeological work at the property of the historic Elkridge Furnace Complex, beginning in July.

References

External links
, including photo from 1974, at Maryland Historical Trust

Archaeological sites in Anne Arundel County, Maryland
Archaeological sites on the National Register of Historic Places in Maryland
Native American history of Maryland
Woodland period
National Register of Historic Places in Anne Arundel County, Maryland